Platyphasia is a genus of crane flies from Australia, containing the following species:
Platyphasia eximia Alexander, 1928
Platyphasia pictonensis Dobrotworsky, 1971
Platyphasia princeps Skuse, 1890
Platyphasia rawlinsoni Dobrotworsky, 1971
Platyphasia regina Alexander, 1922
Platyphasia tasmaniensis Dobrotworsky, 1971
Platyphasia wilsoni Alexander, 1929

References

Tipulidae
Diptera of Australasia